Jake Sisko is a fictional character in the Star Trek franchise. He appears in the television series Star Trek: Deep Space Nine (DS9) and is portrayed by actor Cirroc Lofton. He is the son of Deep Space Nine commanding officer, Benjamin Sisko. The character has also appeared in various other Star Trek books, comics, and video games.

Overview
Jake was born in 2355 to Jennifer Sisko, who was killed in 2367 during the Battle of Wolf 359 when Benjamin Sisko served aboard USS Saratoga (Jake was portrayed by Thomas Hobson for the Saratoga scene). In 2369, he reluctantly moved with his father to space-station Deep Space Nine.

Jake soon becomes friends with a Ferengi named Nog, son of Rom, despite the disapproval of both of their fathers. Jake and Nog were the first students to enroll in Keiko O'Brien's school. When Rom pulls Nog out of school, Jake secretly tutors him. The pair also briefly form the "No-Jay Consortium" as a front for their business schemes.

Jake aspires to be a writer, although he declined a scholarship to the Pennington School (New Zealand) in 2371. He briefly dated a Bajoran dabo girl named Mardah against his father's wishes, who embarrasses Jake by revealing his penchant for dom-jot hustling and poetry. In 2372, Jake wrote a draft of his first novel, Anslem, under the influence of Onaya, an alluring alien woman who feeds on creative neural energy by tactile absorption through the cranium ("The Muse").

As Jake became young adult and felt the need for independence, he moved out of his father's quarters to become roommates with Nog, who is now a Starfleet Academy cadet on DS9 for field study. Jake's slovenliness and Nog's new-found neatness initially strain their friendship, until Benjamin Sisko, as Nog's commander and Jake's father, orders them to settle their differences.

In an alternate timeline ("The Visitor"), Benjamin Sisko is thrust into an odd sub-space dimension after being struck by an errant energy bolt in the USS Defiant engine room. After the accident, Sisko is presumed dead, but he later appears to Jake several times throughout his life. After a short but successful career as a novelist (including the publication of Anslem), Jake spent the rest of his life trying to understand and reverse the accident. Jake learnt that since his father and he were in close proximity when the accident occurred, a strange side effect has been causing Jake to act as a sort of anchor to his father in sub-space throughout the years, occasionally pulling Benjamin Sisko into the real world. Jake determined that if he takes his own life during one of these visits, the connection will be severed and Ben will return to the time of the accident. When he is dying (of natural causes, as an old man) Jake released his father during a final "visit" and his father returned to the past, dodges the energy bolt and prevents this timeline from occurring (Jake as an older man is portrayed in this episode by Tony Todd).

Jake introduces his father to freighter captain Kasidy Yates, with whom he becomes romantically involved and marries in the final months of the Dominion War.

During the Dominion occupation of Deep Space Nine, Jake remains there and serves as a reporter for the Federation News Service, though most of his work is suppressed by Weyoun and the Dominion authorities. Nevertheless, he is able to secretly send messages to his father through Morn.

Jake Sisko does not have a counterpart in the Mirror Universe. Mirror counterparts of Benjamin and Jennifer exist there, but they separate before having a child.

In the series finale, Benjamin Sisko joins the Prophets, leaving Jake and Kasidy at DS9 for the final scene of the series. It is not clear if they remain there.

In the season two episode "Shadowplay", Jake's age is stated as 15. This puts him at about 20 by the end of the series.

References

External links

 Jake Sisko at StarTrek.com

Star Trek: Deep Space Nine characters
Black people in television
Fictional African-American people
Fictional writers
Child characters in television
Fictional reporters
Orphan characters in television
Television characters introduced in 1993
Fictional characters from New Orleans
Fictional war correspondents